Watch the Birdie may refer to:

Films 

Watch the Birdie (1950 film), featuring Red Skelton
Watch the Birdie (1958 film), a Woody Woodpecker short cartoon
Watch the Birdie, a 1975 short film in The Dogfather series

Television 
"Watch the Birdie", a 1966 episode of I Dream of Jeannie
"Watch the Birdie", a 1999 episode of ChuckleVision
"Watch the Birdie", a 1988 episode of Allo 'Allo!
"Watch the Birdie", a 1973 episode of Bless This House
"Watch the Birdie", an episode of Hello Kitty Paradise
"Watch the Birdie / Wubbzy Tells a Whopper", an episode of Wow! Wow! Wubbzy!

Other uses
 Watch the Birdie!, a 1964 play
 "Watch the Birdie", a song on the soundtrack of Lady and the Tramp
 "Watch the Birdie", a song from the film Hellzapoppin'